The Everly Brothers Sing is an album by the Everly Brothers, released by Warner Bros. in 1967. It was re-released on CD by Collectors' Choice Music in 2005.

The album includes their last Top 40 hit, "Bowling Green." It was also their last Top 100 hit until 1984.

Critical reception
Billboard praised the album, singling out "Bowling Green" and the duo's cover of "A Whiter Shade of Pale."

Track listing

Side One
 "Bowling Green" (Terry Slater, Jacqueline Ertel) – 2:50
 "A Voice Within" (Terry Slater) – 2:23
 "I Don't Want to Love You" (Don Everly, Phil Everly) – 2:48
 "It's All Over" (Don Everly) – 2:23
 "Deliver Me" (Daniel Moore) – 2:35
 "Talking to the Flowers" (Terry Slater) – 2:57

Side two
 "Mary Jane" (Terry Slater) – 3:01
 "I'm Finding It Rough" (Patrick Campbell-Lyons, Chris Thomas) – 2:47
 "Do You" (Terry Slater) – 2:47
 "Somebody Help Me" (Jackie Edwards) – 2:01
 "A Whiter Shade of Pale" (Gary Brooker, Keith Reid) – 4:55
 "Mercy, Mercy, Mercy" (Joe Zawinul) – 2:28

Personnel
Don Everly – guitar, vocals
Phil Everly – guitar, vocals
Al Capps – guitar; arrangement on "Bowling Green"
Terry Slater – bass guitar
Al Casey, Glen Campbell, Jay Lacy - guitar on "Bowling Green"
Chuck Berghofer - bass guitar on "Bowling Green"
Don Randi - keyboards on "Bowling Green"
Hal Blaine, Jon Sargent - drums on "Bowling Green"
Jules Jacob - brass on "Bowling Green"
Jay Migliori - woodwind on "Bowling Green"
James Burton - guitar on "Bowling Green" and "It's All Over"
Billy Strange, Gene Page - arrangements
Technical
Eddie Brackett, Wally Heider - engineer
Ed Thrasher - art direction

References

1967 albums
The Everly Brothers albums
albums arranged by Billy Strange
albums arranged by Gene Page
Albums produced by Dick Glasser
Warner Records albums